The Technical Group of the European Right was a far-right political group with seats in the European Parliament between 1989 and 1994.

History
Following the 1989 elections, the previous far-right Group lost its Ulster Unionist and Greek EPEN MEPs. The situation was further complicated when the perennial problem of the European far-right, its inability to form transnational alliances, reasserted itself when MEPs from the German Republikaner party refused to ally themselves with the Italian MSI due to disagreements over the status of South Tyrol. Eventually, the "Technical Group of the European Right" was formed from MEPs from the French Front National, German Republikaner and Belgian Vlaams Blok parties.

In the 1994 elections, the Republikaners failed to reach the 5% cutoff point for German elections and lost all its MEPs. The Technical Group of the European Right no longer had enough MEPs to qualify as a Group and its MEPs returned to the ranks of the independents.

Members

Sources
Searchlight
Australian Nationalist Ideological, Historical, and Legal Archive: Theories Of The Right: A Collection Of Articles
European Consortium for Political Research, University of Essex
BBC News
Europe Politique
European Parliament MEP Archives

References

Former European Parliament party groups
Technical parliamentary groups
Far-right politics